Ghadi may refer to:

 Ghadi, a judge in the two-level hierarchy of Bedouin systems of justice
 Ghadiya, approximately 24 minutes in Hindu units of measurement
 Ghadi (film), a 2013 Lebanese film
 Ghadi, donkey in Urdu

See also 
 Gadi (disambiguation)
 Gadhi (disambiguation)